The 1996–97 Icelandic Hockey League season was the sixth season of the Icelandic Hockey League, the top level of ice hockey in Iceland. Three teams participated in the league, and Skautafelag Akureyrar won the championship.

Regular season

Final 
 Skautafélag Akureyrar - Ísknattleiksfélagið Björninn 3:0 (15:7, 17:7, 12:5)

External links 
 1996-97 season

Icelandic Hockey League
Icelandic Hockey League seasons
1996–97 in Icelandic ice hockey